Sheddrick Tobias "Buck" Gurley (born April 7, 1978) is a former American football defensive tackle.  Gurley played college football for Florida. He played professionally in the NFL for the Miami Dolphins, Chicago Bears, and Tampa Bay Buccaneers and was part of the 2002 Buccaneers team that won Super Bowl XXXVII.

Early years 

Gurley was born in Quincy, Florida in 1978.  He attended Amos P. Godby High School in Tallahassee, Florida, and he played high school football for the Godby Cougars.  Gurley was considered one of the nation's top defensive line prospects, and was recognized as a consensus high school All-American, including first-team All-American honors from USA Today, in 1995.

College career 

Gurley accepted an athletic scholarship to attend the University of Florida in Gainesville, Florida, where he played for coach Steve Spurrier's Florida Gators football team from 1997 to 2000.  As a redshirt senior in 2000, he was a member of the Gators' 2000 SEC Championship team.  Gurley graduated from the University of Florida with a bachelor's degree in health and human performance in 2001.

Professional career 

Gurley was not selected during the 2001 NFL Draft, and he signed with the Miami Dolphins as a free agent after the draft in April 2001. He was cut from the Dolphins after the preseason and later was signed to the Chicago Bears practice squad for several days during the regular season. He signed with the Tampa Bay Buccaneers on March 7, . He played in eight games during the Buccaneers' Super Bowl XXXVII championship season.

See also 

 Florida Gators football, 1990–99
 History of the Tampa Bay Buccaneers
 List of University of Florida alumni

References

Bibliography
 Carlson, Norm, University of Florida Football Vault: The History of the Florida Gators, Whitman Publishing, LLC, Atlanta, Georgia (2007).  .
 Golenbock, Peter, Go Gators!  An Oral History of Florida's Pursuit of Gridiron Glory, Legends Publishing, LLC, St. Petersburg, Florida (2002).  .
 Hairston, Jack, Tales from the Gator Swamp: A Collection of the Greatest Gator Stories Ever Told, Sports Publishing, LLC, Champaign, Illinois (2002).  .
 McCarthy, Kevin M.,  Fightin' Gators: A History of University of Florida Football, Arcadia Publishing, Mount Pleasant, South Carolina (2000).  .

1978 births
Living people
American football defensive tackles
Florida Gators football players
Players of American football from Florida
High school football coaches in Florida
Colonial High School Faculty
People from Quincy, Florida
Tampa Bay Buccaneers players